A small rural location in the Democratic Republic of Congo, Lubondai or Lubondaie is characterized by its Presbyterian and Methodist missions that have built schools, hospitals, and stations.

Populated places in Kasaï-Central